John Lindroth may refer to:

 John Lindroth (athlete) (1906–1974), Finnish pole vaulter
 John Lindroth (gymnast) (1883–1960), Finnish gymnast
 John Lindroth (photographer) (1962-), US Photographer